Église Saint-André de Loreto-di-Casinca is a Catholic baroque church in Loreto-di-Casinca, Haute-Corse, Corsica. The building was classified as a Historic Monument in 1976.

References

Churches in Corsica
Monuments historiques of Corsica
Buildings and structures in Haute-Corse